Karwin may refer to:
Karwin, Lesser Poland Voivodeship, a village in south Poland
Karwin, Lubusz Voivodeship, a village in west Poland
Karwin, West Pomeranian Voivodeship, a village in northwest Poland
Karviná (German: Karwin), a city in the Moravian-Silesian Region of the Czech Republic